Aazmayish is a 1995 Bollywood film starring Dharmendra, Anjali Jathar and producer Mohan Kumar's son Rohit Kumar in his debut.  It is a story of a father and son, directed by actor Sachin.

Summary

Prem Chopra, in a negative role, has his own construction company. Dharmendra is a worker in Prem Chopra's company.
Dharmendra and all the laborers working with the company stay in slums. Prem Chopra's father had promised to build cement houses for all the workers, but his life ended before he could fulfill his promise. When Prem Chopra takes over the control of the company after his father, Dharmendra advocates the demand to get cement houses for all the workers on behalf of the entire labor community. Prem Chopra, a very business-minded person and Dharmendra's demanding nature create an enmity between Dharmendra and Prem Chopra. The story takes a twist when Rohit Kumar and Anjali Jathar fall in love and their relationship is opposed by Prem Chopra, while it is supported by Dharmendra.

Soundtrack

Mohan Kumar opted for Anand–Milind over regulars Laxmikant–Pyarelal to compose the music of the film. However, he retained lyricist Anand Bakshi.

References

External links
 

1995 films
1990s Hindi-language films
Cross-dressing in Indian films
Films scored by Anand–Milind
Films directed by Sachin (actor)